Vernon L. Larson (born October 25, 1948 in Vivian, South Dakota) is an American politician and member of the Republican Party from the U.S. state of South Dakota.

Larson graduated from Vivian High School and received a degree from Northern State University, Aberdeen, South Dakota in 1970.

Larson began his career in politics as a South Dakota field staff member for U.S. Senator James Abdnor.

He served as South Dakota State Auditor from 1979 to 2003. He is the longest-serving constitutional officer in South Dakota's history, and in 1998, he was unopposed for re-election. This was the first time in South Dakota that a constitutional officer had no opposition in the general election.

He was elected state treasurer in 2002 and assumed office on January 6, 2003. He was re-elected in 2006, without opposition, and subsequently left office in 2011, subject to term limits of two consecutive four-year terms.

In August 2013, Governor Dennis Daugaard appointed Larson to serve out the remaining term as South Dakota's Commissioner of School and Public Lands after Commissioner Jarrod Johnson resigned. His term ended in January 2015. He became the first person in South Dakota history to serve in three different statewide executive offices.

Notes

External links
South Dakota Office of the State Treasurer official state site
Follow the Money - Vernon L Larson 2006 campaign contributions
Project Vote Smart - Vernon L Larson (SD) profile

1948 births
Living people
State treasurers of South Dakota
State Auditors of South Dakota
People from Lyman County, South Dakota
Northern State University alumni
South Dakota Republicans